Quanfeng Subdistrict is a subdistrict of Changning City in Hunan, China. The subdistrict was one of 4 subdistricts approved to establish in 2008. The subdistrict of Quanfeng has 4 villages and 5 communities under its jurisdiction.

History
The subdistrict of Quanfeng was approved to form　from 7 villages of Xialian, Chajian, Qingshi, Qushi, Xueqiang, Lengshui and Nanshi, 6 communities of Chengnan, Quanfeng, Laodonglu, Shenglilu, Yidong and Songyi of the former Yiyang Town in 2008, named after the Qianfeng Temple.

Subdivisions
Through the merger of village-level divisions in 2016, its divisions was reduced to 9 from 13. The subdistrict of Quanfeng has 5 communities and 4 villages under its jurisdiction.

5 communities
 Chengnan Community
 Dongyi Community
 Laodonglu Community
 Quanfeng Community
 Shenglilu Community

4 villages
 Nanshui Village
 Qushi Village
 Xialian Village
 Xueqiang Village

References

External links
 Official website

Changning, Hunan
Subdistricts of Hunan